David James Gordon Brydson (January 3, 1907 – February 4, 2001) was a Canadian professional ice hockey centre and golf professional. Brydson played professional ice hockey from 1926 through 1933, including eight games in the National Hockey League (NHL) for the Toronto Maple Leafs during the 1929–30 season.

Hockey career
Brydson made his professional debut in 1926 for Eddie Livingstone's Chicago Cardinals. He scored the first goal of the franchise in its home opener. Like several of the AHA teams, the Cardinals folded without finishing the season. The NHL did not recognize the signing of Brydson by Chicago and awarded his pro-rights to Stratford of the Can-Pro League. Stratford moved him to the Hamilton Tigers where he played the 1927–28 season. The following season he played for the Buffalo Bisons of the Can-Pro. The following season, 1929–30, Brydson made his NHL debut, playing in 14 games for the Maple Leafs. He was sent to the London Panthers for the rest of the season. He moved to the Chicago Shamrocks for two seasons and retired after the 1932–33 season which he played with the Detroit Olympics.

Gold career
Brydson was also an accomplished golfer and after ending his hockey career went on to enjoy many successes as a professional, highlighted by winning the Canadian PGA Championship in 1944 and 1948. He also won the Millar Trophy twice, the provincial opens of Ontario and Quebec, and represented Canada in the Hopkins Trophy on four occasions. He was associated with the Mississauga Golf and Country Club, then of Toronto Township, Ontario. In recognition of his achievements, he was inducted into the Canadian Golf Hall of Fame in 1982. He had also been inducted into the halls of fame of the PGA of Canada and Ontario Golf.

Golfing achievements

Tournament wins
 1930 Ontario Open
 1937 Millar Trophy
 1941 Quebec Open
 1944 Canadian PGA Championship, Ontario Open
 1948 Canadian PGA Championship
 1953 Millar Trophy
 1960 PGA of Canada Seniors Championship
 1962 Ontario Seniors PGA Championship
 1963 Ontario Seniors PGA Championship
 1964 Ontario Seniors PGA Championship
 1965 Ontario Seniors PGA Championship

Team appearances
 Hopkins Trophy (representing Canada): 1952, 1954, 1955, 1956

Career statistics

Regular season and playoffs

References

External links
 
 Profile at Canadian Golf Hall of Fame
 

1907 births
2001 deaths
Buffalo Bisons (IHL) players
Canadian expatriate ice hockey players in the United States
Canadian ice hockey centres
Canadian male golfers
Chicago Cardinals (ice hockey) players
Chicago Shamrocks players
Detroit Olympics (IHL) players
Golfing people from Ontario
Hamilton Tigers (CPHL) players
London Panthers players
Ontario Hockey Association Senior A League (1890–1979) players
Ice hockey people from Toronto
Toronto Maple Leafs players